Amanda Coker (born 1992, in North Carolina) is an American ultra-cyclist and the current record holder of the World Endurance record for distance in a calendar year.

Career 

Coker first began riding alongside her father, Ricky, as a teenager, and found success as a racer, placing sixth in the time trial at the junior national championships in 2010. She later enrolled at Fort Lewis College in Durango, Colorado as part of a collegiate cycling programs.

In 2011 Coker was hit by a distracted motorist, a crash that threw her  and knocked her unconscious, leaving her with a traumatic brain injury.

She resumed cycling in 2015 after recovering from brain and spinal injuries.

On 15 May 2016 Coker started her ride to set a new distance record. Riding a course in Flatwoods Park in Tampa Bay she rode  a day on average.

In April 2017 she surpassed the previous record of  set by Kurt Searvogel.

After setting the new record, Coker continued cycling in an effort to ride over 100,000 miles. For 77 years that record was held by Tommy Godwin, who set off on January 1939 and eventually finished his ride after reaching the  mark in May 1940, after 500 days of cycling. On July 11, 2017, Coker reached , after 423 straight days of cycling.

On October 23, 2021, Amanda set a new road record of 512.506 miles (824.8 km) and became the first woman in history to break 500 miles in 24 hours riding solo. During this 24hr attempt, Amanda also broke 10 other WUCA/Guinness World records for other various durations and distances.

References

 Paul Hoffman, "Officially amazing: Three-time Guinness record holder chats with Cycling Quarterly", South Florida Cycling Quarterly Fall 2017, pages 28–30.

American female cyclists
Ultra-distance cyclists
Living people
1992 births
Sportspeople from North Carolina
21st-century American women